Electoral history of George Wallace, 45th governor of Alabama (1963–1967, 1971–1979, 1983–1987), 1968 American Independent Party presidential nominee and candidate for 1964, 1972 and 1976 Democratic Party presidential nomination

1964 Democratic presidential primaries:
 Pat Brown – 1,693,813 (27.26%)
 Lyndon B. Johnson (inc.) – 1,106,999 (17.82%)
 Sam Yorty – 798,431 (12.85%)
 George Wallace – 672,984 (10.83%)
 John W. Reynolds – 522,405 (8.41%)
 Albert S. Porter – 493,619 (7.94%)
 Matthew E. Welsch – 376,023 (6.05%)
 Daniel Brewster – 267,106 (4.30%)
 Jennings Randolph – 131,432 (2.12%)
 Unpledged delegates – 81,614 (1.31%)
 Robert F. Kennedy – 36,258 (0.58%)

1968 Democratic presidential primaries:
 Eugene McCarthy – 2,914,933 (38.73%)
 Robert F. Kennedy – 2,305,148 (30.63%)
 Stephen M. Young – 549,140 (7.30%)
 Lyndon B. Johnson (inc.) – 383,590 (5.10%)
 Thomas C. Lynch – 380,286 (5.05%)
 Roger D. Branigin – 238,700 (3.17%)
 George Smathers – 236,242 (3.14%)
 Hubert Humphrey – 166,463 (2.21%)
 Unpledged delegates – 161,143 (2.14%)
 Scott Kelly – 128,899 (1.71%)
 George Wallace – 34,489 (0.46%)

1968 Democratic National Convention (presidential tally):
 Hubert Humphrey – 1,760 (67.43%)
 Eugene McCarthy – 601 (23.03%)
 George McGovern – 147 (5.63%)
 Channing E. Phillips – 68 (2.61%)
 Daniel K. Moore – 18 (0.69%)
 Ted Kennedy – 13 (0.50%)
 Paul Bryant – 1 (0.04%)
 James H. Gray – 1 (0.04%)
 George Wallace – 1 (0.04%)

1972 Democratic presidential primaries:
 Hubert Humphrey – 4,121,372 (25.77%)
 George McGovern – 4,053,451 (25.34%)
 George Wallace – 3,755,424 (23.48%)
 Edmund Muskie – 1,840,217 (11.51%)
 Eugene McCarthy – 553,990 (3.46%)
 Henry M. Jackson – 505,198 (3.16%)
 Shirley Chisholm – 430,703 (2.69%)
 Terry Sanford – 331,415 (2.07%)
 John V. Lindsay – 196,406 (1.23%)
 Sam Yorty – 79,446 (0.50%)
 Wilbur Mills – 37,401 (0.23%)
 Walter Fauntroy – 21,217 (0.13%)
 Unpledged delegates – 19,533 (0.12%)
 Ted Kennedy – 16,693 (0.10%)
 Vance Hartke – 11,798 (0.07%)
 Patsy Mink – 8,286 (0.05%)

1972 Democratic National Convention (presidential tally):
 George McGovern – 1,729 (57.37%)
 Henry M. Jackson – 525 (17.42%)
 George Wallace – 382 (12.67%)
 Shirley Chisholm – 152 (5.04%)
 Terry Sanford – 78 (2.59%)
 Hubert Humphrey – 67 (2.22%)
 Wilbur Mills – 34 (1.13%)
 Edmund Muskie – 25 (0.83%)
 Ted Kennedy – 13 (0.43%)
 Wayne L. Hays – 5 (0.17%)
 Eugene McCarthy – 2 (0.07%)
 Ramsey Clark – 1 (0.03%)
 Walter Mondale – 1 (0.03%)

1972 Democratic National Convention (vice presidential tally):
 Thomas Eagleton – 1,742 (59.07%)
 Frances Farenthold – 405 (13.73%)
 Mike Gravel – 226 (7.66%)
 Endicott Peabody – 108 (3.66%)
 Clay Smothers – 74 (2.51%)
 Birch Bayh – 62 (2.10%)
 Peter Rodino – 57 (1.93%)
 Jimmy Carter – 30 (1.02%)
 Shirley Chisholm – 20 (0.68%)
 Moon Landrieu – 19 (0.64%)
 Edward T. Breathitt – 18 (0.61%)
 Ted Kennedy – 15 (0.51%)
 Fred R. Harris – 14 (0.48%)
 Richard G. Hatcher – 11 (0.37%)
 Harold E. Hughes – 10 (0.34%)
 Joseph M. Montoya – 9 (0.31%)
 William L. Guy – 8 (0.27%)
 Adlai Stevenson III – 8 (0.27%)
 Robert Bergland – 5 (0.17%)
 Hodding Carter – 5 (0.17%)
 Cesar Chavez – 5 (0.17%)
 Wilbur Mills – 5 (0.17%)
 Wendell Anderson – 4 (0.14%)
 Stanley Arnold – 4 (0.14%)
 Ron Dellums – 4 (0.14%)
 John J. Houlihan – 4 (0.14%)
 Roberto A. Mondragon – 4 (0.14%)
 Reubin O'Donovan Askew – 3 (0.10%)
 Herman Badillo – 3 (0.10%)
 Eugene McCarthy – 3 (0.10%)
 Claiborne Pell – 3 (0.10%)
 Terry Sanford – 3 (0.10%)
 Ramsey Clark – 2 (0.07%)
 Richard J. Daley – 2 (0.07%)
 John DeCarlo – 2 (0.07%)
 Ernest Gruening – 2 (0.07%)
 Roger Mudd – 2 (0.07%)
 Edmund Muskie – 2 (0.07%)
 Claude Pepper – 2 (0.07%)
 Abraham Ribicoff – 2 (0.07%)
 Pat Taylor – 2 (0.07%)
 Leonard F. Woodcock – 2 (0.07%)
 Bruno Agnoli – 2 (0.07%)
 Ernest Albright – 1 (0.03%)
 William A. Barrett – 1 (0.03%)
 Daniel Berrigan – 1 (0.03%)
 Phillip Berrigan – 1 (0.03%)
 Julian Bond – 1 (0.03%)
 Hargrove Bowles – 1 (0.03%)
 Archibald Burton – 1 (0.03%)
 Phillip Burton – 1 (0.03%)
 William Chappell – 1 (0.03%)
 Lawton Chiles – 1 (0.03%)
 Frank Church – 1 (0.03%)
 Robert Drinan – 1 (0.03%)
 Nick Galifianakis – 1 (0.03%)
 John Goodrich – 1 (0.03%)
 Michael Griffin – 1 (0.03%)
 Martha Griffiths – 1 (0.03%)
 Charles Hamilton – 1 (0.03%)
 Patricia Harris – 1 (0.03%)
 Jim Hunt – 1 (0.03%)
 Daniel Inouye – 1 (0.03%)
 Henry M. Jackson – 1 (0.03%)
 Robery Kariss – 1 (0.03%)
 Allard K. Lowenstein – 1 (0.03%)
 Mao Zedong – 1 (0.03%)
 Eleanor McGovern – 1 (0.03%)
 Martha Mitchell – 1 (0.03%)
 Ralph Nader – 1 (0.03%)
 George Norcross – 1 (0.03%)
 Jerry Rubin – 1 (0.03%)
 Fred Seaman – 1 (0.03%)
 Joe Smith – 1 (0.03%)
 Benjamin Spock – 1 (0.03%)
 Patrick Tavolacci – 1 (0.03%)
 George Wallace – 1 (0.03%)

American Independent Party National Convention, 1972 (presidential tally):
 John G. Schmitz – 330 (71.74%)
 George L. Garfield – 56 (12.17%)
 Allen Grear – 26 (5.65%)
 Thomas J. Anderson – 24 (5.22%)
 Richard B. Kay – 16 (3.48%)
 George Wallace – 8 (1.74%)

1976 Democratic presidential primaries:
 Jimmy Carter – 6,235,609 (39.19%)
 Jerry Brown – 2,449,374 (15.39%)
 George Wallace – 1,955,388 (12.29%)
 Mo Udall – 1,611,754 (10.13%)
 Henry M. Jackson – 1,134,375 (7.13%)
 Frank Church – 830,818 (5.22%)
 Robert Byrd – 340,309 (2.14%)
 Sargent Shriver – 304,399 (1.91%)
 Unpledged delegates – 283,437 (1.78%)
 Ellen McCormack – 238,027 (1.50%)
 Fred R. Harris – 234,568 (1.47%)
 Milton Shapp – 88,254 (0.56%)
 Birch Bayh – 86,438 (0.54%)
 Hubert Humphrey – 61,992 (0.39%)
 Ted Kennedy – 19,805 (0.12%)
 Arthur O. Blessitt – 8,717 (0.06%)
 Lloyd Bentsen – 4,046 (0.03%)

1976 Democratic National Convention (presidential tally):
 Jimmy Carter – 2,239 (74.48%)
 Mo Udall – 330 (10.98%)
 Jerry Brown – 301 (10.01%)
 George Wallace – 57 (1.90%)
 Ellen McCormack – 22 (0.73%)
 Frank Church – 19 (0.63%)
 Hubert Humphrey – 10 (0.33%)
 Henry M. Jackson – 10 (0.33%)
 Fred R. Harris – 9 (0.30%)
 Milton Shapp – 2 (0.07%)
 Robert Byrd – 1 (0.03%)
 Cesar Chavez – 1 (0.03%)
 Leon Jaworski – 1 (0.03%)
 Barbara Jordan – 1 (0.03%)
 Ted Kennedy – 1 (0.03%)
 Jennings Randolph – 1 (0.03%)
 Fred Stover – 1 (0.03%)

1976 Democratic National Convention (vice presidential tally):
 Walter Mondale – 2,817 (94.28%)
 Carl Albert – 36 (1.21%)
 Barbara Jordan – 25 (0.84%)
 Ron Dellums – 20 (0.67%)
 Henry M. Jackson – 16 (0.54%)
 Gary Benoit – 12 (0.40%)
 Frank Church – 11 (0.37%)
 Fritz Efaw – 11 (0.37%)
 Peter Flaherty – 11 (0.37%)
 George Wallace – 6 (0.20%)
 Allard Lowenstein – 5 (0.17%)
 Edmund Muskie – 4 (0.13%)
 Philip Hart – 2 (0.07%)
 Thomas E. Morgan – 2 (0.07%)
 Mo Udall – 2 (0.07%)
 Wendell Anderson – 1 (0.03%)
 Al Castro – 1 (0.03%)
 Fred R. Harris – 1 (0.03%)
 Ernest Hollings – 1 (0.03%)
 Peter Rodino – 1 (0.03%)
 Daniel Schorr – 1 (0.03%)
 Josephnie Smith – 1 (0.03%)
 Hunter S. Thompson – 1 (0.03%)

Democratic primary for Governor of Alabama, 1982:
 George Wallace – 425,469 (42.53%)
 George McMillan – 296,271 (29.62%)
 Joe McCorquodale – 250,614 (25.05%)
 Jim Folsom – 17,333 (1.73%)
 Reuben McKinley – 10,617 (1.06%)

Democratic primary for Governor of Alabama runoff, 1982:
 George Wallace – 512,203 (51.19%)
 George McMillan – 488,444 (48.81%)

1982 Alabama gubernatorial election:
 George Wallace (D) – 650,538 (57.64%)
 Emory M. Folmar (R) – 440,815 (39.06%)
 Leo Suiter (Alabama Conservative) – 17,936 (1.59%)
 Henry Klingler (LBT) – 7,671 (0.68%)
 John Jackson (Alabama National Democrat) – 4,693 (0.42%)
 John Dyer (Prohibition) – 4,364 (0.39%)
 Martin J. Boyers (Socialist Workers) – 2,578 (0.23%)

Gallery

References

Wallace, George
George Wallace